Americominella perminuta is a species of sea snail, a marine gastropod mollusk in the family Eosiphonidae, the whelks and their allies.

Description

Distribution
Americominella perminuta are found in the North Atlantic Ocean and were first found off the coast of Georgia in the southern United States.

References

Eosiphonidae
Gastropods described in 1927